Molly Killingbeck (born March 2, 1959 in Jamaica) is a Canadian athlete who competed in two consecutive Summer Olympics for Canada, starting in 1984.

In 1981, Molly took the silver medal in the 400 metres at the Pacific Conference Games in New Zealand, she also took a gold in the 4 x 100 metre relay and a bronze in the 4 x 400 metre relay.
She won gold medals at the 1982 and 1986 Commonwealth games as a member of the  4 x 400 meter relay team, and a silver as part of the 4 x 100 meter relay team in 1982. She also won 3 silver medals at the World University games in 1983 as a member of both of Canada's 4 x 100 and 4 x 400 meter relay teams, and in the individual 400 meter race, as well as 2 Pan Am Games silver medals in the 1983 and 1987 games in the 4 x 400 meter relay.

At the 1984 Summer Olympics held in Los Angeles, U.S. she won the silver medal in the 4 x 400 metres with her team mates Charmaine Crooks, Jillian Richardson and Marita Payne.

Admission of doping
Killingbeck admitted to using performance enhancing drugs at the Dubin Inquiry in 1989 and subsequently had her funding suspended.

References

 Canadian Olympic Committee

1959 births
Living people
Canadian female sprinters
Canadian sportspeople in doping cases
Doping cases in athletics
Ben Johnson doping case
Commonwealth Games gold medallists for Canada
Commonwealth Games silver medallists for Canada
Athletes (track and field) at the 1982 Commonwealth Games
Athletes (track and field) at the 1986 Commonwealth Games
Pan American Games silver medalists for Canada
Athletes (track and field) at the 1983 Pan American Games
Athletes (track and field) at the 1987 Pan American Games
Olympic silver medalists for Canada
Athletes (track and field) at the 1984 Summer Olympics
Athletes (track and field) at the 1988 Summer Olympics
Jamaican emigrants to Canada
Olympic track and field athletes of Canada
Black Canadian female track and field athletes
Commonwealth Games medallists in athletics
Medalists at the 1984 Summer Olympics
Olympic silver medalists in athletics (track and field)
Pan American Games medalists in athletics (track and field)
Universiade medalists in athletics (track and field)
Universiade silver medalists for Canada
Medalists at the 1983 Summer Universiade
Medalists at the 1987 Pan American Games
Olympic female sprinters
20th-century Canadian women
21st-century Canadian women
Medallists at the 1982 Commonwealth Games
Medallists at the 1986 Commonwealth Games